Jean Calas (1698 – 10 March 1762) was a merchant living in Toulouse, France, who was tried, tortured and executed for the murder of his son, despite his protestations of innocence. Calas was a Protestant in an officially Catholic society. Doubts about his guilt were raised by opponents of the Catholic Church and he was exonerated in 1764. In France, he became a symbolic victim of religious intolerance, along with François-Jean de la Barre and Pierre-Paul Sirven.

Background
Calas, along with his wife, was a Protestant. France was then a Catholic country; Catholicism was the state religion, with no legal right for individuals to practice different faiths. While the harsh oppression of Protestantism initiated by King Louis XIV had largely receded, Protestants were, at best, tolerated. Louis, one of Calas' sons, converted to Catholicism in 1756.

Death of Marc-Antoine Calas

On 13–14 October 1761, another of the Calas sons, Marc-Antoine, was found dead on the ground floor of the family's home. Rumors had it that Jean Calas had killed his son because he intended to convert to Catholicism. When interrogated, the family initially claimed that Marc-Antoine had been killed by a murderer. Then they declared that they had found Marc-Antoine dead, hanged; because suicide was considered a heinous crime against oneself, and the dead bodies of suicides were defiled, they had arranged for their son's suicide to look like a murder.

Trial and execution

Despite Jean Calas claiming that the death was a suicide, and the testimony of Jeanne Vigneire, Calas' Catholic governess, the court in Toulouse held that Jean Calas had murdered his son. Calas was also sentenced to be tortured after being judged and found guilty. His arms and legs were stretched until they were pulled out of their sockets.  of water was poured down his throat. He was tied to a cross in the cathedral square where each of his limbs was broken twice by an iron bar. Even with all this torture, he continued to declare his innocence.

On 9 March 1762 the parliament of Toulouse (regional court) of Toulouse sentenced Jean Calas to death on the wheel. On 10 March, at the age of 64, he died tortured on the wheel, while still firmly claiming his innocence.

Voltaire's intervention and posthumous exoneration

French philosopher Voltaire was contacted about the case, and after initial suspicions that Calas was guilty of anti-Catholic fanaticism were dispelled by his allegations, he began a campaign to get Calas' sentence overturned, claiming that Marc-Antoine had committed suicide because of gambling debts and not being able to finish his university studies due to his denomination.

Voltaire's efforts were successful, and King Louis XV received the family and had the sentence annulled in 1764. The king fired the chief magistrate of Toulouse, the Capitoul, the trial was done over, and in 1765 Jean Calas posthumously was exonerated on a "vice de procedure", not on the original charges, with the family paid 36,000 livres by the king in compensation. Voltaire, an outspoken critic of the Catholic church, cited the instance as an example of the church's severity in his 1763 work Treatise on Tolerance.

References

External links
 l'Affaire Calas (in French)
 Voltaire's Traité sur la Tolérance à l'occasion de la mort de Jean Calas (in French)
 

:fr:Affaire Calas

1698 births
1762 deaths
1762 in Christianity
18th-century executions by France
18th-century French people
Executed French people
History of Catholicism in France
History of Toulouse
Huguenots
People executed by breaking wheel
People executed by the Ancien Régime in France